INS Abhay (P33) ("Fearless") is the lead ship of her class of anti-submarine warfare corvettes, which are in service with the Indian Navy.

Abhay is Sanskrit for fearless. The ship was commissioned on 10 March 1989.

References 

Abhay-class corvettes